Munchkin is a dedicated deck card game by Steve Jackson Games, written by Steve Jackson and illustrated by John Kovalic. It is a humorous take on role-playing games, based on the concept of munchkins (immature role-players, playing only to "win" by having the most powerful character possible).

Munchkin won the 2001 Origins Award for Best Traditional Card Game, and is itself a spin-off of The Munchkin's Guide to Powergaming, a gaming humor book which also won an Origins Award in 2000.

After the success of the original Munchkin game several expansion packs and sequels were published. Now available in 15 different languages, Munchkin accounted for more than 70% of the 2007 sales for Steve Jackson Games and remains their top-selling title through 2020.

Gameplay 

In Munchkin, all players start at level 1, with the goal of reaching level 10 (or level 20 in Epic Level games). Players primarily progress by killing monsters, and level up every time they kill a monster. However, players can freely use cards against monsters and other players during play, allowing them to either assist or to sabotage others during their turn. Each person's turn begins when they "kick down the door" by drawing a Door Card face-up. A Door Card can be one of the following types: a Monster Card, which the player must engage by fighting or fleeing; a Curse Card, which applies an effect; or an Item Card, Race Card, or Class Card, which the player adds to their hand. If the card drawn is not a Monster Card, the player can either "loot the room" by drawing a face-down door card and adding it to their hand, or "look for trouble" by playing a Monster Card from their hand to fight it.

When fighting a monster, the total level of the player (and any supporting players) is weighed against the total level of the monster(s) to determine the victor. A successful player draws the listed amount of treasure cards and levels up either 1 or 2 levels, but an unsuccessful character must roll the dice to try and flee; players who fail to roll a five or six suffer the monster's negative effects ("Bad Stuff") or die. When a player dies, their turn immediately ends and they discard their hand, retaining their player level but drawing a new hand for equipment.

Due to the highly competitive nature of the game and the presence of rule-breaking cards, players are encouraged to use unfair tactics against others, to act mercenary to further themselves at the expense of others, or to use cheat cards to affect outcomes (such as fixing the roll of the die). Throughout a player's turn, others are free to intervene: they can passively buff or debuff the player or monsters to alter the outcome; play monster cards of matching types to make the battle more difficult; or offer to assist the player, typically in exchange for treasure cards.

Other cards that can enter play include Items, which can be used in combat, Treasure Cards, which act as sellable loot and equipment, and Curse Cards, which apply effects. Additionally, players can equip certain cards (such as armor and weapons) to raise their total level and kill stronger monsters, and can use Class Cards and Race Cards to grant extra abilities or advantages at the cost of a balanced weakness; for example, the elf race can level when helping others kill monsters, but will take additional damage from disgusting enemies.

Standard games typically last around an hour, with the game ending once a player reaches the target level and wins the match. Aside from defeating monsters, players can progress through indirect means such as selling cards (with every 1000 Gold on the sum total granting a level) or by playing special leveling cards. Most games disallow victory through indirect methods, meaning only fighting a monster can win the game. There are a few exceptions, however, such as when a player uses cards that specifically state they override rules.

Variants, lite editions, expansions and accessories

Variants
These are themed "box set" editions of Munchkin that have been released. (The overall theme parodied by each set is after the title.) Each is a stand-alone version that can be played separately or combined with any other version for a more expansive game. Most of these editions were illustrated by John Kovalic, although some were done by other artists (who are noted if applicable). Some of these have been released in Deluxe versions (which include a gameboard and movers to keep track of levels) and/or Guest Artist Editions (drawn with new art by artists other than those who originally drew them). Certain versions have been co-produced with USAopoly and/or IDW Games, and feature "character cards" that grant starting powers and keep track of levels. These games are denoted by a "(U)" or an "(I)" after the description, respectively.

The Good, the Bad and the Munchkin (Western films & "Wild West" History)
Moop's Monster Mashup (a mad wizard combines animals into new creatures; art by Ian McGinty)
Munchkin (the original edition); also available in Deluxe Edition and Guest Artist editions by Ian McGinty and Edwin Huang
Munchkin Adventure Time (based on the Cartoon Network animated series; art from & based on the series) (U)
Munchkin Apocalypse ("End of the World"); also in Guest Artist Edition by Len Peralta
Munchkin Axe Cop (based on the web comic by Ethan Nicolle; art by the author)
Munchkin Bites! (horror and "monster" movies)
Munchkin Booty (pirate and "high seas" adventure); also in Guest Artist Edition by Tom Siddell
Munchkin Conan (based on the literary action hero)
Munchkin Crazy Cooks (chefs battle in the kitchen; players can gain Levels either by killing monsters OR acquiring & turning in Food Tokens)
Munchkin Cthulhu (the works of H. P. Lovecraft); also in Guest Artist Edition by Katie Cook
Munchkin Disney DuckTales (based on the original animated series; art from & based on the series) (U)
Munchkin Fu (martial arts and Asian cinema; art by Greg Hyland); also in Guest Artist Edition by John Kovalic
Munchkin Harry Potter Deluxe (based on J. K. Rowling's novels / movies Harry Potter)
Munchkin Impossible (spy & intrigue movies)
Munchkin Legends (classic legendary heroes & monsters); also in Deluxe Edition and Guest Artist Edition by Mike Luckas
Munchkin Magical Mess (a "sequel" to Moop's Monster Mashup; art by Ian McGinty)
Munchkin Marvel (the heroes & villains of the Marvel Comic Universe; art from various Marvel artists) (U)
Munchkin The Nightmare Before Christmas (based on the Tim Burton stop-motion animation film; art based on the film) (U)
Munchkin Oz (based on L. Frank Baum's The Wonderful Wizard of Oz and its sequels); also in Guest Artist Edition by Katie Cook
Munchkin Pathfinder (based on the role-playing game series); also in Deluxe Edition and Guest Artist Edition by Shane White
Munchkin Rick and Morty (based on the Adult Swim animated series; art from & based on the series) (U)
Munchkin Shakespeare (based on the characters created by "the Bard"); also in Deluxe Edition
Munchkin Starfinder (based on the role-playing game series; art by Howard Tayler); also in Kickstarter "I Want It All" Edition
Munchkin Steampunk (19th-century technomages; art by Phil Foglio); also in Deluxe Edition
Munchkin Tails (featuring anthropomorphic animals; art by Katie Cook)
Munchkin Teenage Mutant Ninja Turtles (TMNT-themed version); also available in Deluxe (I)
Munchkin Warhammer 40,000 (based on the miniature wargame)
Munchkin Warhammer: Age of Sigmar (based on the miniature wargame)
Munchkin X-Men (a smaller introductory set themed to Professor X and his teams of mutant pupils; art from various Marvel artists) (U)
Munchkin Zombies (undead fight the living); also in Deluxe Edition and Guest Artist Edition by Greg Hyland
Star Munchkin (science fiction theme); also in Deluxe Edition and Guest Artist Edition by Len Peralta
Super Munchkin (superheroes and super-villains); also in Guest Artist Editions by Art Baltazar and Lar deSouza

Lite Editions
These are streamlined editions of Munchkin with fewer cards (around 112) than a base game. They are stand-alone and are intended for 3-4 players with a shorter play-time.

Munchkin Christmas Lite (Christmas and holiday themed)
Munchkin Grimm Tidings (themed to the stories of the Brothers Grimm)
Munchkin Lite (based on the original Munchkin)
Munchkin Spell Skool (themed to a fictional school of magic; art by Katie Cook)

Expansions
These are "add-on" sets not meant to be played separately, but in conjunction with the base sets of cards. These include fully boxed expansions (usually of 50+ cards) and "booster packs" (less than 50 cards). Some are set-specific, while others can be added to any set or may help combine game sets for an expanded gaming experience.

Set-specific expansions
The Good, the Bad, and the Munchkin 2 – Beating a Dead Horse
Munchkin 2 – Unnatural Axe
Munchkin 3 – Clerical Errors
Munchkin 4 – Need for Steed 
Munchkin 5 – De-Ranged
Munchkin 6 – Demented Dungeons
Munchkin 6.5 – Terrible Tombs
NOTE: Expansions 6 and 6.5 were combined and re-released as Munchkin 6 - Double Dungeons.
Munchkin 7 - More Good Cards
Munchkin 7 – Cheat With Both Hands (a combined re-release of Munchkin Blender and More Good Cards)
Munchkin 8 – Half Horse, Will Travel
Munchkin 9 – Jurassic Snark
Munchkin 10 – Time Warp
Munchkin Rigged Demo
Munchkin Adventure Time 2 – It's a Dungeon Crawl!
Munchkin Apocalypse 2 – Sheep Impact
NOTE: This was also made as a Guest Artist Edition by Len Peralta.
Munchkin Apocalypse: Judge Dredd
Munchkin Apocalypse: Mars Attacks!
Munchkin Bites! 2 – Pants Macabre
Munchkin Booty 2 – Jump the Shark
Munchkin Booty: Fish & Ships
Munchkin Cthulhu 2 – Call of Cowthulhu
Munchkin Cthulhu 3 – The Unspeakable Vault
Munchkin Cthulhu 4 – Crazed Caverns
Munchkin Cthulhu: Sanity Check
Munchkin Cthulhu Cursed Demo
Munchkin Deadpool: Just Deadpool (MARVEL-themed Booster Pack)
Munchkin Fu 2 – Monky Business
Munchkin Legends 2 – Faun and Games
Munchkin Legends 3 – Myth Prints
Munchkin Marvel 2 – Mystic Mayhem
Munchkin Marvel 3 – Cosmic Chaos
Munchkin Oz 2 – Yellow Brick Raid
Munchkin Pathfinder 2 – Guns and Razzes
Munchkin Pathfinder 3 - Odd Ventures
Munchkin Pathfinder: Gobsmacked!
Munchkin Pathfinder: Truly Gobnoxious
Munchkin Shakespeare Limited Engagement
Munchkin Shakespeare Staged Demo
Munchkin Starfinder 2 - Far Out
Munchkin Steampunk: Girl Genius
Munchkin Warhammer 40,000 - Faith and Firepower
Munchkin Warhammer 40,000 - Savagery and Sorcery
Munchkin Warhammer Age of Sigmar - Chaos and Order
Munchkin Warhammer Age of Sigmar - Death and Destruction
Munchkin Zombies 2 – Armed and Dangerous
Munchkin Zombies 3 – Hideous Hideouts
Munchkin Zombies 4 – Spare Parts
Munchkin Zombies: The Walking Dead 
Munchkin Zombies: Grave Mistakes 
Star Munchkin 2 – The Clown Wars
Star Munchkin 3 – Diplomatic Impunity
Star Munchkin: Space Ships
Star Munchkin: Cosmic Demo
Star Munchkin: Landing Party
Super Munchkin 2 – The Narrow S Cape

Non-set-specific expansions

Generic expansions
These are meant to be used with any Base Set, and may or may not have unique card backs.
Munchkin Blender
Munchkin Clowns
Munchkin Conan the Barbarian ("Booster Pack" released prior to the CONAN Base Set)
Munchkin Curses
Munchkin Dragons 
Munchkin Fairy Dust
Munchkin The Guild
Munchkin Game Changers  
Munchkin Hipsters
Munchkin Kittens
Munchkin Knights
Munchkin Marked For Death
Munchkin Puppies
Munchkin Undead
Munchkin Red Dragon Inn

Holiday-themed expansions
These have original Munchkin backs, but can be used with any Base Set.
Munchkin Easter Eggs
Munchkin Holidazed
Munchkin Love Shark Baby
Munchkin Naughty & Nice
NOTE: Re-released in Munchkin Holiday Surprise
Munchkin Reindeer Games
NOTE: Re-released in Munchkin Holiday Surprise
Munchkin Santa's Revenge
NOTE: Re-released in Munchkin Holiday Surprise
Munchkin Tricky Treats
Munchkin Waiting for Santa
NOTE: Re-released in Munchkin Holiday Surprise

Mixed expansions
These expansions contain cards for several different Base Sets.
Exclusive Warehouse 23 Munchkin Booster 2010
Exclusive Warehouse 23 Munchkin Booster 2011
Exclusive Warehouse 23 Munchkin Booster 2012
Exclusive Warehouse 23 Munchkin Booster 2013
Exclusive Warehouse 23 Munchkin Booster 2014
Munchkin Gets Promoted
Munchkin Gets Promoted 2
Munchkin Go Up a Level

Promo items
In addition, many Promo Cards and Bookmarks have been released for the various sets. These are individual cards or bookmarks (most with in-game bonuses or effects) usually included with orders from the online store (Warehouse 23), available with special offers or given away at events by company & fan representatives (aka "Men In Black").

Accessories

These are items that are Munchkin-themed, but not necessarily used in the main gameplay. Items so themed may include exclusive cards for certain games, and may also have in-game effects when kept near the play area. These include:

Munchkin Boxes Of Holding & Monster Boxes (storage boxes for cards)
Munchkin Kill-O-Meters (dial cards for keeping track of combat strengths)
Munchkin Game Boards (used for keeping track of levels)
Munchkin Pawns (used in conjunction with the Game Boards)
Munchkin Playmats (soft mousepad-like versions of the game boards)
Munchkin Dice Sets (both generalized and set-specific D6 and D10s)
Munchkin Apparel (t-shirts, polo shirts, cloisonne pins, etc.) 
Munchkin Plushes (soft figurines of creatures & characters from the game)
Munchkin Card Sleeves, Coloring Books, Bookmarks and other such items
The Munchkin Book (a collection of essays about the game)
A full listing of such accessories can be found on the MUNCHKIN.GAME web page.

Munchkin-themed games 
These are games related to the Munchkin universe, but they do not follow the exact rules and goals of the traditional Munchkin card game.  Some are card games and others are combined board/card games.

Published by Steve Jackson Games
 Munchkin Quest (four-player combined board/card game with elements of the original Munchkin card game)
 Munchkin Quest 2 - Looking for Trouble (expansion to allow for six players, plus extra rooms, doors, monsters & cards)
 Munchkin Quest: Portal Kombat (Adds "Portal" Doors and more cards)
 Munchkin Treasure Hunt (a simplified board/card kids version of the original game)
 Munchkin Wonderland (a reworking of Treasure Hunt themed on the Alice books by Lewis Carroll)

Published by other game companies
Munchkin Panic (based on Castle Panic by Fireside Games)
Munchkin Loot Letter (based on Love Letter by Z-Man Games)
Munchkin Gloom (based on Gloom by Atlas Games)
Smash Up: Munchkin (based on Smash Up by Alderac Entertainment Group)

Munchkin Treasure Hunt and Munchkin Wonderland are aimed at children ages 6 and up, allowing families with young children to be able to enjoy Munchkin games, while the other Munchkin-themed games are for ages 10 and up like all other Munchkin games.

Reception 
An early review on RPGnet regards Munchkin as not a very serious game; the rules make this clear with phrases like "Decide who goes first by rolling the dice and arguing about the results and the meaning of this sentence and whether the fact that a word seems to be missing any effect," and "Any disputes in the rules should be settled by loud arguments with the owner of the game having the last word." There are many cards which interact with or are affected by a single other card, despite the rarity of the two cards entering play together (such as the interaction between Fowl Fiend and Chicken on Your Head or Sword of Slaying Everything Except Squid and Squidzilla).

On BoardGameGeek the average user rating is 6/10.
Tom Vasel of The Dice Tower was critical of the game Munchkin feeling it was overpriced, had limited re-playability, and a poor and occasionally tedious gaming experience.

In a review of Munchkin in Black Gate, Mark Rigney said "Here there be dragons, yes, but also a lot of snide references aimed at society in general. For my money (thank goodness, our box of Munchkin was a gift, so it cost me nothing), it's all in good fun."

Inspiration 
Being very popular, the game inspired a mini-game on the social network Reddit. In this game, named Kick Open the door as a reference of the base mechanics of the base game, monsters are revealed in the form of posts on a Subreddit. The players can then attack the monsters using commands to trigger a bot that will count the damage dealt. The weapons used to fight the monsters are also inspired by the original Munckhin card game.

References

External links 

 
 Steve Jackson Games
 Steve Jackson and others playing a game of Munchkin on Tabletop
 Munchkin on Board Game Geek

Card games introduced in 2001
Dedicated deck card games
Fantasy parodies
Steve Jackson (American game designer) games
Origins Award winners
Steve Jackson Games games